Once Upon a Summertime is an album by trumpeter Chet Baker which was recorded in 1977 and released on the Artists House label in 1980.

Reception

The AllMusic review by Scott Yanow states "The challenging material ("The Song Is You" is the only one of the five songs that is a standard) inspires the musicians to play creative solos".

Track listing
 "Tidal Breeze" (Harold Danko) – 6:49
 "Shifting Down" (Kenny Dorham) – 7:30
 "E.S.P." (Wayne Shorter) – 5:39
 "The Song Is You" (Jerome Kern, Oscar Hammerstein II) – 9:15
 "Once Upon a Summertime" (Eddie Barclay, Michel Legrand) – 11:22

Personnel
Chet Baker – trumpet
Gregory Herbert – tenor saxophone
Harold Danko – piano
Ron Carter – bass
Mel Lewis – drums

References

Chet Baker albums
1980 albums
Artists House albums